Ramli bin Mamat is a Malaysian politician and served as Kelantan State Executive Councillor.

Election results

References

Malaysian Islamic Party politicians
Members of the Kelantan State Legislative Assembly
Kelantan state executive councillors
21st-century Malaysian politicians
Living people
Year of birth missing (living people)
People from Kelantan
Malaysian people of Malay descent
Malaysian Muslims